Four ships of the Royal Navy have been named HMS Bacchus, after the Greco-Roman deity Bacchus:

 was a 10-gun  built in Bermuda in 1806 and captured in 1807.
 was a Dutch 10-gun schooner launched c.1806, that the Royal Navy captured in 1807, took into service in 1808, and broke up in 1812.
 was an 18-gun  launched in 1813 and expended as a breakwater in 1829.
 was a 46-gun fifth rate launched in 1817, and renamed HMS Bacchus in 1844 upon her conversion into a hulk; she was broken up in 1883.

References
 

Royal Navy ship names